Kamianske is the name of several locations in Ukraine.

 Kamianske, Kamianske Raion, Dnipropetrovsk Oblast
 Kamianske, Zakarpattia Oblast
 Kamianske, Vasylivka Raion